Mihăești is a commune in Argeș County, Muntenia, Romania. It is composed of seven villages: Drăghici, Furnicoși, Mihăești, Rudeni, Valea Bradului, Valea Popii and Văcarea.

The Râul Târgului crosses the commune from north to south.

References

External links

Communes in Argeș County
Localities in Muntenia